Jul is a Christmas song written by Ralf Peeker from the band Snowstorm and recorded by him and released as a single in 1983 with "Mirabelle" as B-side.

Background
The song describes Christmas time from the perspective of homeless people in Brunnsparken, Gothenburg, and is also known from the chorus opening lines "men det är någon i Brunnsparken som gråter".

The song lyrics also includes references to the poem "Tomten" by Viktor Rydberg, and the TV programme Kalle Anka och hans vänner önskar God Jul.

Thorleifs version
 
In 1989, the song was recorded by Thorleifs, and released as a single with "A Morning at Cornwall" as B-side on the record label Doreme.

References

1983 singles
1989 singles
Swedish Christmas songs
Songs about homelessness
Protest songs
Swedish-language songs
Thorleifs songs
1983 songs
Mariann Grammofon singles